Districtus Austriae Controllatus (Latin for Controlled District of Austria), DAC, is a classification for regionally typical quality wine (legal category "Qualitätswein") in Austria. It is loosely modelled on the French Appellation d'Origine Contrôlée (AOC) system, and is coupled with a ripeness-based classification scale that shares a lot of nomenclature with the German Prädikat system. Thus, if a label states the winegrowing region followed by the letter combination “DAC” (e.g. Kamptal DAC) we are talking about a regionally typical quality wine. All Austrian quality wines have a round, red and white striped "Banderole" on the capsule, which ensures, that it has been inspected and approved by the government tasting authority and fulfills the requirements for “Qualitätswein”, such as maximum yields per hectare, minimum must weight and alcohol levels and guaranteed origin of the grapes.

DACs are created for specific regions to establish clearly the local stylistic profile, in alignment with the French concept of terroir. Like in AOC, DAC wines are labelled only with the regional name and not the varietal unless more than one varietal is allowed. Wines carrying the name of a grape variety or a vintage year must be composed of at least 85% of that grape or vintage, respectively.

Background
In the 1985 diethylene glycol wine scandal, several Austrian wineries illegally adulterated their wines using the toxic substance diethylene glycol to make the wines appear sweeter and more full-bodied in the style of late harvest wines.  Resulting from the scandal, much stricter wine laws were enacted, and the Austrian wine industry focused production primarily on dry white wines instead of sweet wines.

For these dry wines, the Prädikatswein designations (such as Spätlese or Auslese) shared with the German wine classification system, were seen as less suitable. Just as in Germany, much of the high-end dry wines therefore ended up using the designation "Qualitätswein", which in principle was seen as below the Prädikatswein. In Wachau, regional designations for dry wines were created as a response; Steinfeder, Federspiel and Smaragd. However, several organisations pressed in the 1990s for a different national system to be introduced, with "appellation-style" designations based on geographical origin rather than on must weight, with regulations for each DAC regarding allowed grape varieties and wine styles.

The result was the Districtus Austriae Controllatus system, the framework regulations of which was introduced in 2001. The first DAC region to be approved was Weinviertel DAC, which happened in 2003, with the designation possible to use from the 2002 vintage.

Rules for individual DACs are developed by regional committees which include representation from grape growers and wine producers, wine cooperatives, and wine merchants. The DAC requirements must at least correspond to those for Austrian Qualitätswein and the underlying European Union wine regulations, but the committees are free to set higher standards for a specific DAC. Each wine to be sold as DAC has to be submitted to a tasting committee. It has been common for the DACs to include two quality levels, Klassik for a "standard" DAC wine, and the additional designation Reserve for a DAC wine which fulfills slightly stricter or different requirements.

Effects of DAC introduction
Once a winegrowing region receives DAC status, the region's name may only be used for wines that fulfill the DAC regulations. Other wines, such as those made from other grape varieties, are no longer allowed to use the region's name. This typically means that the name of the larger wine region, of which the DAC forms a part, has to be used instead, e.g. "Niederösterreich" instead of "Weinviertel".

DAC regions 
As of February 2022, Wagram DAC is the newest DAC winegrowing region, bringing the total to seventeen (out of eighteen).

References 

 
Austrian wine
Appellations